Nationality words link to articles with information on the nation's poetry or literature (for instance, Irish or France).

Events
 June 18 – Release in the United Kingdom of a new film, The Edge of Love, concerning Dylan Thomas' relationship with two women, starring Keira Knightley, Sienna Miller, Cillian Murphy and Matthew Rhys (as Thomas).
 September – A United Kingdom examination board, Assessment and Qualifications Alliance, asks schools to withdraw copies of its anthology which contain the poem, Education for Leisure by Carol Ann Duffy after some teachers complained about the poem's reference to knives. Other teachers oppose the move, and Duffy responds with a new poem, Mrs Schofield's GCSE.
 December 15 – The American Academy of Arts and Sciences begins awarding the May Sarton prize. Five "emerging poets" each year will receive a $2,000 honorarium and an opportunity to have their work published in the Academy's journal, Daedalus (for winners, see "Awards and honors" section, below).
 Dennis Brutus is awarded the Lifetime Honorary Award by the South African Department of Arts and Culture for his lifelong dedication to African and world poetry and literary arts. Brutus was also an activist who was imprisoned and incarcerated in the cell next to Nelson Mandela's on Robben Island from 1963 to 1965.
 Complaints about Carol Ann Duffy's poem "Education for Leisure" cause it to be withdrawn from the AQA Anthology studied in English schools.
 Dmitry Vodennikov wins a Russian poetry competition television show, "King of the Poets".
 POETomu (a play on the English word "poet" and the Russian word poetomu ("because")), a glossy magazine about poetry, is founded in Russia.

Works published in English
Listed by nation where the work was first published and again by the poet's native land, if different; substantially revised works listed separately:

Australia

 Robert Adamson, The Golden Bird, winner of the C. J. Dennis Prize for Poetry in the 2009 Victorian Premier's Literary Awards, shortlisted for the 2009 Age Book of the Year Awards
 Michael Brennan, Unanimous Night
 David Brooks, The Balcony, finalist for the 2008 Kenneth Slessor Prize for Poetry; University of Queensland Press, 
 Elizabeth Hodgson, Skin Painting, winner of the 2007 David Unaipon Award; University of Queensland Press, 
 Sarah Holland-Batt, Aria, University of Queensland Press, winner of the Judith Wright Prize and the Anne Elder Award
 Yvette Holt, Anonymous Premonition, winner of the 2005 David Unaipon Award for an unpublished manuscript, Victorian Premier's Literary Award for Indigenous Writing (2008), and the Poets Union's Scanlon Prize for Indigenous Poetry (2008)
 Clive James, Opal Sunset: Selected Poems, 1958–2008, W.W. Norton
 Carol Jenkins, Fishing in the Devonian, Puncher & Wattmann
 John Kinsella, Divine Comedy, University of Queensland Press, 
 Anthony Lawrence, Bark, University of Queensland Press, 
 Bronwyn Lea, The Other Way Out, Giramondo Publishing
 David Malouf, Revolving Days, University of Queensland Press, 
 Peter Rose, The Best Australian Poems 2008, including work from: Dorothy Porter, Robert Adamson, Judith Beveridge, Rosemary Dobson, Laurie Duggan, Stephen Edgar, Clive James, John Kinsella, Les Murray, Lisa Gorton, Geoffrey Lehmann, Tracy Ryan and Brenda Walker, Chris Wallace-Crabbe and Fay Zwicky; Black Inc.,

Canada
 Kyle Buckley, The Laundromat Essay, a long poem (Coach House Books) 
 Margaret Christakos, What Stirs, (Coach House Books) 
 Jen Currin, Hagiography (Coach House Books) 
 Jeramy Dodds, Crabwise to the Hounds (Coach House Books) 
 
 Nancy Holmes, Open Wide a Wilderness: Canadian Nature Poems, Wilfrid Laurier University Press 
 Randall Maggs, Night Work: The Sawchuk Poems (Brick Books) 
 George McWhirter, The Anachronicles (Ronsdale Press) 
 Joe Rosenblatt & Catherine Owen, Dog; photos by Karen Moe. Toronto: Mansfield Press.
 Jordan Scott, Blert (Coach House Books) 
 David Silverberg, editor, Mic Check: An Anthology Of Canadian Spoken Word Poetry, Quattro Books, 
 Todd Swift, Seaway: New and Selected Poems (Salmon Poetry) 
 R. M. Vaughan, Troubled, (Coach House Books) 
 Zachariah Wells, editor, Jailbreaks: 99 Canadian Sonnets, (Biblioasis)

India, Indian poetry in English
 Antony Theodore, Divine Moments : Journey through the Year, 
 Arundhathi Subramaniam, translator, The Absent Traveller: Prākrit love poetry from the Gāthāsaptaśatī of Sātavāhana Hāla, New Delhi: Penguin India, 
 Bibhu Padhi, poet, Going to the Temple, 
 Eunice de Souza, editor, Both Sides of the Sky, Post-Independence Poetry in English, New Delhi: National Book Trust, 
 Meena Alexander, Quickly Changing River (Poetry in English), Triquarterly Books, by an Indian writing living in and published in the United States
 Jeet Thayil:
 These Errors Are Correct, Delhi: Tranquebar Books (EastWest and Westland)
 Editor, The Bloodaxe Book of Contemporary Indian Poets, Bloodaxe, anthology of Indian poetry in English, published in the United Kingdom
 Sujata Bhatt (2008). "Pure Lizard" (Poetry in English), Carcanet Press. Retrieved 2008-09-13.

Ireland
 Guzstáv Báger, Object Found, translated by Thomas Kabdebo; Hungarian poet published in Ireland (Salmon Press) 
 Ciaran Berry, The Sphere of Birds, Oldcastle: The Gallery Press, 
 Dermot Bolger, External Affairs, 80 pages, New Island Press, 
 Andrew Carpenter, editor, Thornfield: Poems by the Thornfield Poets (Salmon Press)  (anthology)
 Ciarán Carson:
 Collected Poems, Oldcastle: The Gallery Press, 
 For All We Know, Oldcastle: The Gallery Press,  
 Eileen Casey, Drinking the Colour Blue
 Gerald Dawe, Points West, Oldcastle: The Gallery Press, 
 Frank Golden, In Daily Accord (Salmon Press) 
 Maurice Harmon, The Mischievous Boy and other poems (Salmon Press) 
 Anne Le Marquand Hartigan, To Keep the Light Burning: Reflections in Times of Loss, poetry and prose (Salmon Poetry) 
 Kevin Higgins, Time Gentlemen, Please (Salmon Press) 
 Peter van de Kamp, In Train, Dutch native living in Ireland (Salmon Press) 
 Caroline Lynch, Lost in the Gaeltacht (Salmon Press) 
 Alan Jude Moore, Lost Republics (Salmon Poetry) 
 Patrick Moran, Green (Salmon Press) 
 Eiléan Ní Chuilleanáin: Selected Poems Gallery Press, London: Oldcastle and Faber, Irish work published in the United Kingdom
 Nuala Ní Dhomhnaill, The Fifty Minute Mermaid, translated from Irish by Paul Muldoon, Gallery Press, 
 Ulick O'Connor, The Kiss: New and Selected Poems and Translations (Salmon Press) 
 Lorna Shaughnessy, Torching the Brown River (Salmon Press) 
 Eamon Wall, A Tour of Your Country Irish native living in the United States, published in Ireland (Salmon Press)

New Zealand
 Jenny Bornholdt, The Rocky Shore, winner of the Montana New Zealand Book Award for Poetry (announced September 2009)
 Kevin Ireland, How To Survive The Morning, Cape Catley Ltd, 
 C. K. Stead, Collected Poems 1951–2006, winner of the"reference and anthology" category of the Montana New Zealand Book Awards (announced September 2009)
 Vladimir Nabokov (posthumous), edited by Brian Boyd (New Zealand academic) and Stanislav Shvabrin, ' 'Verses and Versions:  Three Centuries of Russian Poetry Selected and translated by Vladimir Nabokov' ', English translations of Russian poetry, presented next to the Russian originals, Harcourt (published in the United States)
 Sam Sampson, Everything Talks, Auckland University Press and Shearsman Books; winner of the 2009 New Zealand Society of Authors Jessie Mackay Best First Book Award for Poetry

Best New Zealand Poetry 2007
The year's guest editor, who chose 25 poems for inclusion, was Paula Green. The list appeared at the series website in February 2008.

 Johanna Aitchison
 Angela Andrews
 Serie (Cherie) Barford
 Sarah Jane Barnett
 Jenny Bornholdt

 Alistair Te Ariki Campbell
 Janet Charman
 Geoff Cochrane
 Fiona Farrell
 Cliff Fell

 Bernadette Hall
 Anna Jackson
 Andrew Johnston
 Anne Kennedy
 Jessica Le Bas

 Dora Malech
 Alice Miller
 Emma Neale
 Vincent O’Sullivan
 Vivienne Plumb

 Richard Reeve
 Elizabeth Smither
 C. K. Stead
 Robert Sullivan
 Alison Wong

United Kingdom
 Paul Thomas Abbott, FLOOD (Clutag Press) 
 Moniza Alvi:
 Europa, shortlisted for the T.S. Eliot Prize; Bloodaxe Books
 Split World: Poems 1990–2005, Bloodaxe Books
 Annemarie Austin, Very: New and Selected Poems, Bloodaxe Books, Bloodaxe Books
 Mourid Barghouti, Midnight and Other Poems, translated by Radwa Ashour, Palestinian poet published in the United Kingdom (Arc Publications), 
 Paul Batchelor, The Sinking Road
 Marck L. Beggs, Catastrophic Chords (Salmon Poetry) 
 Robyn Bolam, New Wings
 Zoë Brigley, The Secret
 Constantine Cavafy, The Selected Poems of Cavafy, translated from the original Greek by Avi Sharon, Penguin Classic, 
 Felix Dennis, Homeless in my Heart, Ebury Press (Random House), 
 Menna Elfyn, Perfect Blemish, translated by Elin Ap Hywel from the original Welsh; Bloodaxe Books
 Janet Frame, Storms Will Tell: Selected Poems, Bloodaxe Books; posthumously published
 Anne Gorrick, Kyotologic, Shearsman Books,  (American, published in the United Kingdom)
 Chris Greenhalgh, The Invention of Zero, Bloodaxe Books
 Jane Griffiths, Another Country: New and Selected Poems, Bloodaxe Books
 Liam Guilar, Lady Godiva and Me (Nine Arches Press) 
 Jen Hadfield, Nigh-no-place, Bloodaxe Books
 David Harsent, Selected Poems 1969–2005, 
 Selima Hill:
 Gloria: Selected Poems, Bloodaxe Books
 The Hat, Bloodaxe Books
 Mick Imlah, The Lost Leader, Faber and Faber, 
 Clive James, Angels Over Elsinore: Collected Verse 2003–2008 (Picador)
 Esther Jansma, What It Is, edited and translated by Francis R. Jones from the original Dutch, Bloodaxe Books
 Daniel Kane, Ostentation of Peacocks, (Egg Box Publishing) 
 Jackie Kay:
 Darling: New and Selected Poems, Bloodaxe Books
 The Lamplighter, Bloodaxe Books
 Agnes Lehoczky, Budapest to Babel, (Egg Box Publishing) 
 Ira Lightman, Duetcetera (Shearsman Books) 
 Jack Mapanje, Beasts of Nalunga, Bloodaxe Books
 Robert Minhinnick, King Driftwood, Carcanet  Welsh poet, writing in English
 Kenji Miyazawa, Strong in the Rain: Selected Poems, translated from the original Japanese by Roger Pulvers, Bloodaxe Books
 Eiléan Ní Chuilleanáin: Selected Poems Gallery Press, London: Oldcastle and Faber, Irish work published in the United Kingdom
 Stephanie Norgate, Hidden River, Bloodaxe Books
 Naomi Shihab Nye, Tender Spot: Selected Poems, Bloodaxe Books
 Sean O'Brien, Andrew Marvell: poems selected by Sean O'Brien (Poet to Poet series, Faber and Faber)
 Julie O'Callaghan, Tell Me This Is Normal: New & Selected Poems, Bloodaxe Books
 Pamela Robertson-Pearse, editor, In Person: 30 Poets, including two DVDs, Bloodaxe Books
 Anne Rouse, The Upshot: New and Selected Poems, Bloodaxe Books
 John Sears, Reading George Szirtes, Bloodaxe Books
 Yi Sha, Starve the Poets!, edited and translated from the original Chinese by Simon Patton and Tao Naikan, Bloodaxe Books
 Elena Shvarts, Birdsong on the Seabed, edited and translated from the original Russian by Sasha Dugdale, Bloodaxe Books
 Pauline Stainer, Crossing the Snowline, Bloodaxe Books
 George Szirtes, New and Collected Poems, Bloodaxe Books
 Edward Thomas, The Annotated Collected Poems, Bloodaxe Books
 Ruth Thompson, The Flaggy Shore, (bluechrome Publishing)  Northern Irish poet published in United Kingdom
 Tomas Venclova, The Junction, translated from the original Lithuanian by Ellen Hinsey, Bloodaxe Books
 Rab Wilson, Life Sentence: More Poems Chiefly in the Scots Dialect (Luath Press Ltd)

Anthologies in the United Kingdom
 Lesley Duncan, editor, 100 Favourite Poems of the Day (Luath Press Ltd) 
 Mark Richardson, editor, The Big Green Poetry Machine Poems from Scotland (Young Writers) 
 Jeet Thayil, editor, The Bloodaxe Book of Contemporary Indian Poets, Bloodaxe Books 
 Forward Book of Poetry 2009 (published October 2008), Faber and Faber,

Criticism, biography and scholarship in the United Kingdom
 Bloodaxe Poetry Lectures: a series of talks by poets at the University of Newcastle upon Tyne about the craft and practice of poetry, published by Bloodaxe Books:
 Maura Dooley, editor, Life Under Water
 Jane Hirshfield, Hiddenness, Uncertainty, Surprise
 Jo Shapcott, The Transformers: Newcastle
 Josephine Nock-Hee Park, Apparitions of Asia: Modernist Form and Asian American Poetics, Oxford University Press, scholarship
 James Persoon and Robert R. Watson, editors, The Facts on File Companion to British Poetry, 1900 to the Present 
 Shira Wolosky, The Art of Poetry: How to Read a Poem, Oxford University Press, scholarship

United States

 Meena Alexander, Quickly Changing River, Triquarterly Books, by an Indian writing living in and published in the United States
 Rae Armantrout:Versed (Wesleyan, 2008)
 Mary Jo Bang, Elegy, Graywolf Press
 Ed Barrett, Bosston, Boston: Pressed Wafer, 
 Frank Bidart,  Watching the Spring Festival (Macmillan/Farrar, Straus and Giroux), 
 Charles Bukowski, The People Look Like Flowers At Last: New Poems, purportedly the "fifth and final" posthumous collection
 William Corbett, Opening Day (Hanging Loose Press, 2008)
 Robert Creeley, Selected Poems, 1945–2005, edited by Benjamin Friedlander, University of California Press
 Mark Doty:
 Theories and Apparitions, London: Jonathan Cape
 Fire to Fire: New and Selected Poems, New York, HarperCollins
 Elvis Dino Esquivel, Sólo lloré en otoño (Spanish), Solar Empire Publishing, 
 Reginald Gibbons, Creatures of a Day, Louisiana State University Press, 
 Anne Gorrick, Kyotologic, Shearsman Books,  (American, published in the United Kingdom)
 Jorie Graham, Sea Change Ecco/HarperCollins
 Geoffrey Hill, A Treatise of Civil Power, Yale University Press, 
 John Hollander, A Draft of Light, Knopf (in May), his 19th book of poems
 Richard Howard, Without Saying (Turtle Point Press) 
 Kimberly Johnson, "A Metaphorical God" (Persea Books) 
 Devin Johnston, Sources, (Turtle Point Press)
 George Johnston, The Essential George Johnston, selected by Robyn Sarah, The Porcupine's Quill, 
 August Kleinzahler, ' 'Sleeping It Off in Rapid City' ', Farrar, Straus and Giroux
 Ted Kooser, Valentines, University of Nebraska Press
 David Lehman, editor, The Best American Erotic Poems: From 1800 to the Present (anthology), Scribner

 Sarah Lindsay, Twigs and Knucklebones, Copper Canyon Press
 Magus Magnus, Verb Sap, Narrow House 
 Jackson Mac Low, Thing of Beauty: New and Selected Works (edited by Anne Tardos), (University of California Press)
 James Merrill, Selected Poems, edited by J. D. McClatchy and Stephen Yenser (Alfred A. Knopf)
 W. S. Merwin, The Shadow of Sirius; Port Townsend, Washington: Copper Canyon Press; awarded the Pulitzer Prize for Poetry in 2009
 Rusty Morrison, true keeps calm biding its story, Small Press Distribution, .
 George Oppen, Selected Prose, Daybooks, and Papers (edited by Stephen Cope), (University of California Press) (publication was 2007, but not available until 2008)
 Peter Oresick, Warhol-o-rama, Carnegie Mellon University Press
 Danielle Pafunda, ' 'My Zorba' ', Bloof Books
 Grace Paley, Fidelity (Farrar, Straus & Giroux), posthumous
 Kenneth Patchen, The Walking-Away World, New Directions,  (posthumous)
 Alan Michael Parker, Elephants & Butterflies, BOA Editions, 
 Jacqueline Risset, Sleep's Powers, translated from French by Jennifer Moxley, Ugly Duckling Presse 
 Aram Saroyan, Complete Minimal Poems, Ugly Duckling Presse 
 Leslie Scalapino, It's go in horizontal: Selected Poems, 1974–2006, (University of California Press)
 Susan M. Schultz, Dementia Blog, (Singing Horse Press)
 Ron Silliman, The Alphabet, University of Alabama Press, 
 Patricia Smith, Blood Dazzler
 Jack Spicer, my vocabulary did this to me: The Collected Poetry of Jack Spicer, edited by Peter Gizzi and Kevin Killian, Wesleyan University Press,  (posthumous)
Gertrude Stein, Tender Buttons, introduction by Steve McCaffery, BookThug, Toronto
Richard Tayson, The World Underneath (Kent State University Press)
 David Wagoner, A Map of the Night (University of Illinois Press)
 Francis X. Walker, When Winter Come: The Ascension of York, University of Kentucky Press
 John Witte, Second Nature, University of Washington Press, 
 Mark Yakich, The Importance of Peeling Potatoes in Ukraine, Penguin

Anthologies in the United States
 Tina Chang and Nathalie Handal, editors, Language for a New Century: Contemporary Poetry from the Middle East, Asia, and Beyond, W. W. Norton & Company, 
 Vladimir Nabokov (posthumous), edited by Brian Boyd and Stanislav Shvabrin, Verses and Versions: Three Centuries of Russian Poetry Selected and translated by Vladimir Nabokov, English translations of Russian poetry, presented next to the Russian originals, Harcourt
 Nguyen Do and Paul Hoover, editors, Black Dog, Black Night, anthology of contemporary Vietnamese poetry from 21 poets, many of whom had never previously been translated into English; Milkweed 
 Leslie Pockell and Celia Johnson, editors, 100 Poems to Lift Your Spirits, Grand Central Publishing, 
 Reginald Shepherd, editor, Lyric Postmodernisms: An Anthology of Contemporary Poetries, Counterpath Press, 
 Jason Shinder, John Lithgow, Billy Collins, editors, The Poem I Turn To: Actors and Directors Present Poetry That Inspires Them, 
 Mark Strand and Jeb Livingood, editors, Best New Poets 2008, including work by Zach Savich, Heidi Poon, and Malachi Black
 Carolyne Wright, editor and translator, Majestic Nights: Love Poems of Bengali Women, Buffalo, New York: White Pine Press,

Criticism, scholarship and biography in the United States
 Michael Almereyda, editor, Night Wraps the Sky: Writings by and about Mayakovsky (Macmillan/Farrar, Straus, and Giroux), 
 Robert Frost, The Collected Prose of Robert Frost, edited by Mark Richardson; Frost was reluctant to publish his collected prose and even said he lost his notes to the Charles Eliot Norton Lectures he delivered at Harvard in 1936 (Harvard University Press)
 Donald Hall, Unpacking the Boxes: A Memoir of a Life in Poetry, Houghton Mifflin
 Michael Heller, Speaking the Estranged: Essays on the Work of George Oppen, Cambridge UK: Salt Publishing
 Michael Palmer, Active Boundaries: Selected Essays and Talks, New Directions (New York, NY), 2008. 
 Reginald Shepherd, Orpheus in the Bronx: Essays on Identity, Politics, and the Freedom of Poetry, University of Michigan Press
 Jan Ziolkowski and Bridget K. Balint, editors, A Garland of Satire, Wisdom, and History: Latin Verse from Twelfth-Century France (Carmina Houghtoniensia), Harvard University Press,

Poets in The Best American Poetry 2008
These poets appeared in The Best American Poetry 2008, with David Lehman, general editor, and Charles Wright, guest editor (who selected the poetry) (Scribner ):

Tom Andrews
Ralph Angel
Rae Armantrout
John Ashbery
Joshua Beckman
Marvin Bell
Charles Bernstein
Ciaran Berry
Frank Bidart
Robert Bly
John Casteen
Laura Cronk
 
Kate Daniels
Lydia Davis
Erica Dawson
Cornelius Eady
Moira Egan
Peter Everwine
Carolyn Forche
Chris Forhan
John Gallaher
James Galvin
Louise Gluck
Robert Hass
  
Bob Hicok
Brenda Hillman
Tony Hoagland
Garrett Hongo
Richard Howard
Mark Jarman
George Kalamars
Mary Karr
Maxine Kumin
Adrie Kusserow
Alex Lemon
Philip Levine
  
J.D. McClatchy
Davis McCombs
W. S. Merwin
Susan Mitchell
Paul Muldoon
D. Nurkse
Debra Nystrom
Meghan O'Rourke
Ron Padgett
Michael Palmer
D. A. Powell
Alberto Rios
 
Tim Ross
John Rybicki
Ira Sadoff
Sherod Santos
Frederick Seidel
Charles Simic
R. T. Smith
Patti Smith
Dave Snyder
Lisa Ross Sparr
David St. John
Kathryn Starbuck
 
Alan Sullivan
Chad Sweeney
Mary Szybist
James Tate
Natasha Trethewey
Lee Upton
Dara Wier
C. K. Williams
Franz Wright
Lynn Xu
C. Dale Young
 
David Young
Dean Young
Kevin Young

Works published in other languages

French language

France
 Stéphane Bataillon, Sylvestre Clancier and Bruno Doucey, editors, Poésies de langue française: 144 poètes d'aujourd'hui autour du monde ("Poems in the French Language: 144 Contemporary Poets from Around the World"), Éditions Seghurs, anthology
 Yves Bonnefoy, La Longue Chaîne de l'Ancre ("The Anchor's Long Chain"), publisher: Mercure de France
 Hélène Dorion, Le Hublot des heures, Paris, Éditions de La Différence; Canadian poet published in France
 Haïjin, translated from her Japanese edition, Du rouge aux lèvres ("Red lips"), publisher: La Table Ronde, short poems to be read aloud in a single breath
 Philippe Jaccottet, Ce peu de bruits ("This Little Noise"), publisher: Gallimard
 Vénus Khoury-Ghata, Les Obscurcis, publisher: Mercure de France
 Abdellatif Laabi, Tribulations d'un rêveur attitré, coll. La Clepsydre, La Différence, Paris, Moroccan author writing French and published in France
 Jacques Prévert (illustrated with photography by Izis Bidermanas), Grand bal du printemps, publisher: Le Cherche midi
 Jean Max Tixier, Le grenier à sel, publisher: Encres vives
 Jean-Vincent Verdonnet, Mots en maraude, illustrated by Marie-Claude Enevoldsen-Bussat, Publisher: Voix d'Encre

Canadian poetry in French
 Roger Des Roches, Dixhuitjuilletdeuxmillequatre, winner of the Prix Chasse-Spleen
 Hélène Dorion, Le Hublot des heures, Paris, Éditions de La Différence; Canadian poet published in France

Germany
 Christoph Buchwald, series editor, and Ulf Stolterfoht, guest editor, Jahrbuch der Lyrik 2008 ("Yearbook of Poetry 2008"), Frankfurt: Fischer (S.), 215 pages, anthology
 Christoph Janacs:
 die Ungewissheit der Barke/la barca sin certidumbre ("The Uncertainty of the Boat"), publisher: Arovell
 Nachtwache ("Nightwatch"), Edition Thanhäuser, 37 poems; St. Georgs Presse
 Bjoern Kuligk and Jan Wagner, editors, Lyrik von Jetzt 2 ("Poetry of Now 2"), publisher: Berlin Verlag, featuring poetry by 50 authors born after 1969 (a follow-up volume to Lyrik von Jetzt, published in 2003
 Steffen Popp, Kolonie zur Sonne: Gedichte ("Colony to the Sun: Poems"), Kookbooks, 59 pages, 
 Sabine Scho:
 Album: Gedichte ("Album: Poems"), Kookbooks, 62 pages, 
 Farben ("Colors"), Kookbooks, 78 pages,

Greece
 Michael Longley, Το χταπόδι του Ομήρου ("The Octopus of Homer"), translated from the original English of the Irish author by Harris Vlavianos, Athens: Patakis
 Katerina Iliopoulou, Asylum, Melani editions
 George Koropoulis (Γιώργος Κοροπούλης), Αντιύλη ("Antimatter'"), Athens: Upsilon
 Dionysis Kapsalis (Διονύσης Καψάλης), Όλα τα δειλινά του κόσμου ("All the Sunsets in the World"), Athens: Agra
 Stamatis Polenakis, Notre Dames, publisher: Odos Panos Editions

India
Listed in alphabetical order by first name:
 Bharat Majhi, Highware Kuhudi, Bhubaneswar: Pakshighara Prakasani; Oriya
 Jiban Narah, Momaideur Phulani, Guwahati, Assam: Banalata; Assamese-language
 K. Siva Reddy, Posaganivannee, Hyderabad: Jhari Poetry Circle, Telugu-language
 P. P. Ramachandran, Kalamkaari, Kottayam: DC Books; Malayalam
 Raghavan Atholi, Chavumazhakal, Kottayam: DC Books; Malayalam
 Rituraj, Chuni Huin Kavitayen, Hindi-language
 Sitanshu Yashaschandra, Vakhar, Mumbai and Ahmedabad: R R Sheth & Co.; Gujarati
 Teji Grover, Maitri, Bikaner: Surya Prakashan Mandir, Hindi-language

Iran
 Sarvenaz Heraner, Sarrizha-yi sukut (“Overflowing of Silence”)
 Mohammad Reza Shafi'i Kadkani, editor, Gozideh-ye Ghazaliyat-e Shams extensive, annotated selections from Divan-e Shams-e Tabrizi ("The Collected Poems of Shams of Tabriz")by Rumi; Persian, published in Iran
 Ru'ya Muqaddas, Ru'yaha-yi 'ashiqanah: 'ashiqanahha-yi Ru'ya ("Loverly Reveries: Love Songs of Ru'ya")

Poland
 Kazimierz Brakoniecki, Glosolalie
 Ryszard Kapuściński, Wiersze zebrane, posthumously published
 Ludwik Jerzy Kern, Litery cztery. Wiersze prawie wszystkie
 Krzysztof Koehler, Porwanie Europy ("Kidnapping Europe")
 Tadeusz Różewicz, Kup kota w worku, Wrocław: Biuro Literackie
 Eugeniusz Tkaczyszyn-Dycki, Piosenka o zależnościach i uzależnieniach, winner of both the Gdynia Literary Prize, for poetry and the Nike Award for literature in 2009

Russia
 Yelena Fanailova, Baltisky dnevnik ("Baltic Diary")
 Yelena Shvarts, Collected Works, Volumes 3 and 4
 Books of poetry were published by Mikhail Aizenberg, Vasily Borodin, Natalya Gorbanevskaya, Alla Gorbunova, Vadim Mesyats, Andrey Rodionov and Aleksey Tsvetkov

Other languages
 Herberto Helder, A faca não corta o fogo: súmula e inédita; Portugal
 Jang Jin-sung, I Am Selling My Daughter for 100 Won (내 딸을 백원에 팝니다), Korea
 Tarawa Machi, Japanese tanka poet, translated into French by Yves-Marie Allioux, Salad Anniversary ("L'Anniversaire de la Salade"), Éditions Philippe Picquier
 Pia Tafdrup, Boomerang, Copenhagen: Gyldendal Publishers, Denmark
 Rahman Henry, Gottrobhumikaheen, Bhasachitra, Dhaka, Bangladesh. Bangladesh; Shrestha Kabita, NODEE publishing and Media House, Dhaka, Bangladesh
 Ghassan Zaqtan, Like a Straw Bird it Follows Me, Palestinian (Arabic)

Awards and honors

International
Golden Wreath of Poetry: Fatos Arapi (Albania)
Beca Internacional Antonio Machado de creación poética: Subhro Bandopadhyay (India)

Australia awards and honors
 C. J. Dennis Prize for Poetry: Robert Adamson, The Golden Bird (Black Inc); finalists: Carol Jenkins – Fishing in the Devonian (Puncher and Wattman); Bronwyn Lea, The Other Way Out (Giramondo Publishing)
 Kenneth Slessor Prize for Poetry
 Arts Queensland Judith Wright Calanthe Award
 Arts ACT Judith Wright Prize
 Fellowship of Australian Writers Anne Elder Award

Canada awards and honors
 Lampman-Scott Award: Shane Rhodes, The Bindery
 Gerald Lampert Award: Alex Boyd, Making Bones Walk
 Governor General's Awards:
 English language: Jacob Scheier, More to Keep Us Warm
 French language: Michel Pleau, La Lanteur du monde
 Griffin Poetry Prize: Canadian: Robin Blaser, The Holy Forest: Collected Poems
 Griffin Poetry Prize: International, in the English Language: John Ashbery, Notes from the Air: Selected Later Poems (HarperCollins Publishers/Ecco)
 Others on the shortlist: David Harsent, Selected Poems 1969–2005 (Faber); Elaine Equi, Ripple Effect: New and Selected Poems (Coffee House Press); Clayton Eshleman, translating from the Spanish by César Vallejo, The Complete Poetry: A Bilingual Edition (University of California Press)
 Pat Lowther Award: Anne Simpson, Quick
 Prix Alain-Grandbois: Nathalie Stephens, ...s'arrête? Je
 Dorothy Livesay Poetry Prize: Rita Wong, Forage
 Prix Émile-Nelligan: Catherine Lalonde, Corps étranger

India awards and honors
Sahitya Akademi Award : Jayant Parmer for Pencil Aur Doosri Nazmein (Urdu)
Jnanpith Award : Akhlaq Mohammed Khan (Shahryar)

New Zealand awards and honors
 Prime Minister's Awards for Literary Achievement:
 Montana New Zealand Book Awards (poetry categories):
 Poetry - Janet Charman, Cold Snack. Auckland University Press
 Jessie Mackay Best First Book of Poetry - Jessica Le Bas, Incognito. Auckland University Press

United Kingdom awards and honors
 Cholmondeley Award: John Burnside, David Harsent, John Greening and Sarah Maguire
 Costa Award (formerly "Whitbread Awards") for poetry: Jean Sprackland, Tilt (Cape)
 Shortlist (announced in November 2007): Ian Duhig, The Speed of Dark, John Fuller, The Space of Joy, Daljit Nagra, Look We Have Coming to Dover!
 English Association's Fellows' Poetry Prizes: Tony Flynn (first prize), Kim Rooney (second prize) and Peter Cash and Simon Jackson (joint third prize)
 Eric Gregory Award (for a collection of poems by a poet under the age of 30): Emily Berry, Rhiannon Hooson, James Midgley, Adam O'Riordan and Heather Phillipson
 Forward Poetry Prize:
Best Collection:
Shortlist: Sujata Bhatt, Pure Lizard (Carcanet); Jane Griffiths, Another Country (Bloodaxe); Jen Hadfield, Nigh-No-Place (Bloodaxe); Mick Imlah, The Lost Leader (Faber), Jamie McKendrick, Crocodiles & Obelisks (Faber); and Catherine Smith, Lip (Smith/Doorstop)
Best First Collection:
Shortlist: Simon Barraclough, Andrew Forster, Frances Leviston, Allison McVety, Stephanie Norgate and Kathryn Simmonds
 Jerwood Aldeburgh First Collection Prize for poetry:
Shortlist: Paul Batchelor, The Sinking Road (Bloodaxe Books); Ciaran Berry, The Sphere of Birds (Gallery Press); Adam Foulds, The Broken Word (Cape Poetry); Frances Leviston, Public Dream (Picador Poetry); Stephanie Norgate, Hidden River (Bloodaxe Books)
 Manchester Poetry Prize: Lesley Saunders and Mandy Coe
 National Poet of Wales: Gillian Clarke succeeds Gwyn Thomas
 National Poetry Competition : Christopher James for Farewell to Earth
 T. S. Eliot Prize (United Kingdom and Ireland): Sean O'Brien The Drowned Book (Judges: Peter Porter, W. N. Herbert and Sujata Bhatt)
Shortlist (announced in November 2007): Ian Duhig, Alan Gillis, Sophie Hannah, Mimi Khalvati, Frances Leviston, Sarah Maguire, Edwin Morgan, Poetry Review's Fiona Sampson, and Matthew Sweeney
 The Times/Stephen Spender Prize for Poetry Translation:
 Wigtown Poetry Competition (Scotland's largest poetry prize): Jane Weir, first prize

United States awards and honors
 Agnes Lynch Starrett Poetry Prize awarded to Cheryl Dumesnil for In Praise of Falling
 American Academy of Arts and Sciences prize for poetry: Arda Collins, Matthew Dickman, Dawn Lundy Martin, Meghan O'Rourke, Matthew Zapruder; Judges (all fellows of the Academy): Paul Muldoon, Carl Phillips, Charles Simic, C. D. Wright, and Adam Zagajewski
 AML Award for poetry to Neil Aitken for The Lost Country of Sight and Warren Hatch for Mapping the Bones of the World
 Andrés Montoya Poetry Prize awarded to Paul Martínez Pompa for My Kill Adore Him
 Lenore Marshall Poetry Prize: Henri Cole for Blackbird and Wolf
 National Book Award for Poetry: Mark Doty for Fire to Fire: New and Selected Poems
 The New Criterion Poetry Prize:
 The Poetry Center Book Award (2008): – Barbara Guest (awarded posthumously) for The Collected Poems of Barbara Guest (ed. Hadley Haden Guest, Wesleyan University Press); Judge: Eileen Tabios
 Pulitzer Prize for Poetry (United States): Robert Hass for Time and Materials; and Philip Schultz for Failure
 Poet Laureate of Virginia: Claudia Emerson, two year appointment 2008 to 2010
 Wallace Stevens Award: Louise Gluck
 PEN Award for Poetry in Translation: Rosmarie Waldrop for Lingos I – IX by Ulf Stolterfoht (Burning Deck, 2007)
 Ruth Lilly Poetry Prize : Gary Snyder
 Whiting Awards: Rick Hilles, Douglas Kearney, Julie Sheehan

From the Poetry Society of America
 Frost Medal: Michael S. Harper
 Shelley Memorial Award: Ed Roberson, Judges: Lyn Hejinian & C.D. Wright
 Writer Magazine/Emily Dickinson Award: Joanie Mackowski, Judge: Donald Revell
 Lyric Poetry Award: Wayne Miller, Judge: Elizabeth Macklin
 Lucille Medwick Memorial Award: Christina Pugh, Judge: Timothy Donnelly; finalist: Sally Ball
 Alice Fay Di Castagnola Award: Natasha Sajé, Judge: Dean Young; finalists: Kevin Prufer & James Richardson
 Louise Louis/Emily F. Bourne Student Poetry Award: Carey Powers, Judge: David Roderick; finalists: Willa Granger & Philip Sparks
 George Bogin Memorial Award: Theresa Sotto, Judge: by Prageeta Sharma
 Robert H. Winner Memorial Award: Jocelyn Emerson, Judge: by Annie Finch; finalists: Rachel Conrad & Marsha Pomerantz
 Cecil Hemley Memorial Award: Brian Henry, Judge: Norma Cole
 Norma Farber First Book Award: Catherine Imbriglio for Parts of the Mass, published by Burning Deck, Judge: Thylias Moss); finalist: Alena Hairston for The Logan Topographies, published by Persea
 William Carlos Williams Award: Aram Saroyan for Complete Minimal Poems, published by Ugly Duckling Presse; Judge: Ron Silliman; finalists: Roberta Beary for The Unworn Necklace, published by Snapshot Press; and Eileen Myles for Sorry, Tree, published by Wave Books

Other awards and honors
 Japan: Akutagawa Prize for works published in the second half of 2007: Mieko Kawakami, Chichi to Ran (乳と卵) ("Of Breasts and Eggs")

Deaths
Birth years link to the corresponding "[year] in poetry" article:
 January 1 – Wanda Sieradzka de Ruig, 85, Polish author, poet, journalist and translator.   (Polish)
 January 3:
 Henri Chopin, 85, French poet
 Petru Dugulescu, 62, Romanian Baptist pastor, poet and politician, heart attack. 
 John O'Donohue, 52, Irish poet, philosopher and priest 
 January 4 – Stig Claesson (born 1928), Swedish
 January 5 – Rowan Ayers (born 1922) English television producer and poet
 January 12:
 Ángel González Muñiz, 82, Spanish 
Adriano González León, 76, Venezuelan writer and poet
 January 16 – Hone Tuwhare, 85, New Zealander 
 January 21 – Burton Hatlen, 71, American scholar, founding member of the National Poetry Foundation, mentor and teacher to Stephen King, who promoted the work of the Objectivist poets
 February 7 – Frank Geerk (born 1946), German
 February 13 – raúlrsalinas, 73, American Chicano poet, complications of liver cancer
 February 28 – Max Nord (born 1916)) Dutch
 March 10 – Ana Kalandadze, 83, Georgian
 March 16 – Jonathan Williams, 79, American poet, publisher and founder of The Jargon Society
 March 19 – Hugo Claus (born 1929), Flemish novelist, poet, playwright, painter, film director writing primarily in Dutch
 March 23 – E. A. Markham, 68, Montserrat-born British poet and writer. 
 March 26 – Robert Fagles, 74, American professor, poet and translator of ancient epics, prostate cancer. 
 April 3 – Andrew Crozier, 64, English poet associated with the British Poetry Revival, with connections to American poetry, who edited volumes by American poet Carl Rakosi After Rakosi's Selected Poems, published in 1941, Rakosi dedicated himself to social work and apparently neither read nor wrote any poetry at all. A letter from Crozier to Rakosi asking about his early poetry was the trigger that started Rakosi writing again. His first book in 26 years, Amulet was published by New Directions in 1967 and his Collected Poems in 1986 by the National Poetry Foundation; of a brain tumour. 
 April 13 – Robert Greacen, 87, Irish poet 
 April 14 – Horst Bingel (born 1933), German writer, poet, graphic artist and publisher
 April 15 – Parvin Dowlatabadi, 84, Iranian children's author and poet, of heart attack 
 April 17:
 Aimé Césaire, 94, French-Martiniquan poet and politician
 April 17 – Werner Dürrson (born 1932), German
 Mikhail Tanich, 84, Russian poet, kidney problems
 April 24 – Jason Shinder, 53 (born 1955), American poet, editor, anthologist and teacher who founded the Y.M.C.A. National Writer's Voice program, one of the country's largest networks of literary-arts centers, at one time an assistant to Allen Ginsberg
May 1 – Alberto Estima de Oliveira, 74, Portuguese poet  (Portuguese)
 May 2 – Ilyas Malayev, 72, Uzbek musician, wedding entertainer and poet. "His performances in stadiums drew tens of thousands of Uzbeks, and his appeal reached beyond his native republic", according to The New York Times.
 May 19 – Rimma Kazakova, 76, Russian poet.
 May 25:
 George Garrett, 78, American novelist and poet, cancer 
Alejandro Romualdo, 82, Peruvian
 May 29 – Paula Gunn Allen, 68, Native American poet, novelist, and activist, lung cancer
 June 5:
 Angus Calder (born 1942) Scottish academic, writer, historian, poet and literary editor
 Eugenio Montejo, 70, Venezuelan poet, essayist and ambassador, of stomach cancer
 June 8 – Peter Rühmkorf (born 1929), German writer and poet
 June 11 – James Reaney (born 1926) Canadian poet, playwright and literary critic
 June 16 – Aleda Shirley (born 1955) American poet
 June 29 – William Buchan, 3rd Baron Tweedsmuir, also known as "William Tweedsmuir" (born 1916), an English peer and author of novels, short stories, memoirs and verse
 July 4 – Thomas M. Disch, 68, American poet and novelist; suicide
 July 16 – Richard Exner (born 1929) German and American poet, academic and translator who moved to the United States in 1950, then moved to Germany after his retirement
 July 19 – Samudra Gupta, 62, Bangladeshi poet, gallbladder cancer 
 July 9 – Kilin, pen name of Mikiel Spiteri, 90, Maltese poet and novelist; fluent in six languages and published in English, Spanish and other languages
 July 24 – Alain Suied, 51 (born 1951), French poet, from cancer
 August 9 – Mahmoud Darwish, 67, Palestinian poet; complications following heart surgery.
 August 24 – Wei Wei, 88, Chinese poet and writer, liver cancer
 August 25 – Ahmed Faraz, pseudonym of Syed Ahmad Shah, 77 (born 1931), Pakistani Urdu-language poet and son of Agha Syed Muhammad Shah Bark Kohati, a leading traditional poet, from kidney failure
 August 28 – İlhan Berk, 89, Turkish
 September 10 – Reginald Shepherd, 44, American poet, complications from colon cancer
 September 15 – John Matshikiza, 53, South African actor, writer and poet; heart attack
 September 20 – Duncan Glen, 75, British poet, critic and literary historian
 September 28 – Konstantin Pavlov, 75 (born 1933), Bulgarian poet and screenwriter who was defiant against his country's communist regime; When censors prevented his works from being published officially in the country from 1966 to 1976, his popularity didn't wane, as Bulgarians clandestinely copied and read his poems.
 September 29 – Hayden Carruth, 87, American poet and literary critic
 September 30 – Christa Reinig (born 1926), German
 October 6 – Paavo Haavikko, 77, Finnish poet and playwright, after long illness
 October 15 – Fazıl Hüsnü Dağlarca, 94, Turkish poet; chronic renal failure
 October 25 – Tahereh Saffarzadeh, 72, Iranian poet and academic, cancer
 November 5 -- James Liddy, 74, Irish American poet, cancer.
 November 10 – Fries de Vries (1931–2008) Dutch
 November 15, – Donald Finkel, 79 (born 1929), American poet, husband of poet and novelist Constance Urdang, complications from Alzheimer's disease
 November 16 – Tibor Gyurkovics, 77, Hungarian poet, writer and publicist
 November 20 – Gyula Takáts, 97, Hungarian poet, writer and translator
 December 1 – Peter Maiwald (born 1946) German
 December 2 – Ann Darr (born 1920) American poet and World War II pilot.
 December 5 – Altaf Nia, 44, Kashmiri poet and academic
 December 10 – Dorothy Porter, 54, Australian
 December 14 – Tajal Bewas, pen name of Taj Mohammed Samoo, 70 (born 1938), bucolic Sufi poet, novelist, short-story writer, teacher and Pakistani government official
 December 15 – Jwalamukhi (pen name of Akaram Veeravelli Raghavacharya), 71 (born 1938), Indian poet and president of the India-China Friendship Association
 December 20 – Adrian Mitchell, 74, (born 1934), English poet, playwright, children's author, journalist and political activist, of heart failure
 December 22 – Nanao Sakaki (born 1923), Japanese poet and leading personality of "the Tribe", a counter-cultural group
 December 24 – Harold Pinter, 78 (born 1930), English playwright, poet, actor, theatre director, screenwriter, human rights activist, winner of the 2005 Nobel Prize for Literature

Notes

Sources
 Britannica Book of the Year 2009 (events of 2008), published by the Encyclopædia Britannica, online edition (subscription required), "Literature/Year in Review 2008" section

See also

Poetry
List of poetry awards

2000s in poetry
Poetry